Wilhelm Caspar Ferdinand Freiherr von Dörnberg  (14 April 1768, Schloss Hausen near Bad Hersfeld - 19 March 1850, Münster) was a German general. He was also known as 'Aufstandsdörnberg' or 'Uprising Dörnberg', for his part in the German campaign of the Napoleonic Wars. He also fought as a brigade commander at Quatre Bras and Waterloo.

Life

Family
The family of Freiherrs of Dörnberg derived from the Protestant Hessian nobility and was a member of the Old-Hessian 'Ritterschaft'. Since 1732 it had held the office of Erbküchenmeister (Erbhofmeister) of Hesse-Kassel.

Early career
Dörnberg joined the First Guard Battalion of Hesse-Kassel in January 1783 and was appointed First Lieutenant on 22January 1785. His  first war experience was gained in the 1792 in campaign against France in the Champagne Region. On 6December 1792, he received his patent as a Staff Captain.

Dörnberg's Uprising (22–24 April 1809)
Dörnberg was involved with various anti-French plotters and agitators both locally in Westphalia and likely within Berlin. He accepted a commission in the Westphalian Guard in December 1807 and rose quickly in rank apparently gaining King Jerome's trust.

He was even promoted to Royal Adjutant and commander of the Garde-Jäger in late February 1809.

With an imminent war between France and Austria in the spring of 1809, it must have seemed to the plotters that the time was right. A separate early April insurrection by former Lieutenant Katte was apparently planned to seize the important fortress of Magdeburg. Despite Katte's rebellion quick collapse by the 5th of April, Dörnberg and his followers continued with their own plans around the capital of Westphalia, Kassel.

By the morning of 22 April 1809 several different groups began moves originally designed to seize King Jerome and secure the capital. But coordination was difficult and the lack of discipline was fatal to the cause. By the morning of April 23, a small yet organized French and Westphalian force (most of the 1st Cuirassiers under Oberst Marschall) led by GD Jean-Jacques Reubell opposed the southern mob of rebels that eventually gathered at the tiny hamlet of Knallhütte (now Kirchbauna) 10 kilometers south of Kassel and quickly dispersed them.

Dörnberg himself fled south and in civilian disguise eventually made it to Bohemia.

Another force of about 1,200 rebels and rebels of the 1st Cuirassier heavy cavalrymen to the west met a similar fate at Wolfhagen where they were opposed by GB Philippe de Rivet Comte d'Albignac and the 1st Squadron of Garde Chevauxlegers largely of Polish soldiers. In the aftermath, the leader of the rebel Cuirassiers claimed to have only been pretending to join the rebels to avoid being captured by them. He also later fled.

A final group of about 4,000 was approaching the capital from the North West and halted about 8 kilometers outside the city. When news of Dörnberg's defeat and disappearance reached them, this mob also began to disperse. Despite some of the leaders heading east and trying again, these few were seized by the local authorities and sent to the capital as prisoners.

As evening closed on the 23rd of April, the uprising had collapsed and its leadership had either fled or been captured.

Later career

Prior to the Battle of Waterloo, Dornberg detained a British scout who was bringing news of Napoleon’s troop movements to Wellington. As a result of the delay of this intelligence, Wellington was unable to concentrate his forces in time to support Blucher at the Battle of Ligny. British Senior Intelligence Officer Colquhoun Grant attributed the subsequent loss at Ligny to the “stupidity of a Hanoverian cavalry brigadier”.

References

1768 births
1850 deaths
People from Schwalm-Eder-Kreis
German commanders of the Napoleonic Wars
Barons of Germany
Honorary Knights Commander of the Order of the Bath
Recipients of the Waterloo Medal
Recipients of the Order of St. George